Kedi is a 2010 Indian Telugu-language action film produced by D.Sivaprasad Reddy under the Kamakshi Movies banner and directed by Kiran Kumar. The film stars Nagarjuna Akkineni and Mamta Mohandas, with Ankur Vikal in the role of the antagonist. The music score is by Sandeep Chowtha, who previously wrote music for Nagarjuna's films Ninne Pelladutha (1996), Chandralekha (1998) and Super (2005). The film was released on 12 February 2010.It was also released in Tamil as Singa Vettai.

Plot
Ramesh, nickname Rummy (Nagarjuna) loves his childhood friend Janaki, who asks him to become rich and powerful before marrying her. With this motive, Rummy starts gambling and becomes rich in no time.

ACP Sekhar (Shayaji Shinde) notice his activities and attempts to catch him. Rummy moves to Goa where he meets Chandra (Ankur), a pub owner who also runs gambling, both of them make a deal. While on the task, Rummy rescues Sara (Paula) from Victor. Sara's sister Nadia (Linda) falls in love with him. Another woman, Sandhya (Mamta Mohandas), enters his life. She helps him with his task. Meanwhile, differences arise between Rummy and Chandra, and they become rivals. How Rummy encounters the situation with Janaki forms the rest of the story

Cast

 Nagarjuna Akkineni as Ramesh "Rummy"
 Mamta Mohandas as Janaki / Sandhya
 Ankur Vikal as Chandra
 Sayaji Shinde as Mumbai Police Commissioner Shekhar Ranawat Shinde
 Kelly Dorji as Victor
 Brahmanandam as Six Foot
 Sunil as Rummy's sidekick
 Tanikella Bharani as Rummy's father
 Jayavani as Rummy's mother
 Mukul Dev as Human Bomb
 Harsha Vardhan as Arshad, Rummy's partner in crime
 Linda Arsenio as Nadia
 Akhilendra Mishra as Shailendra Yadav
 Stunt Silva as a smuggler
 Nirmal Pandey as Razzak Bhai (Terrorist)
 Kamal 
 Selva 
 Manto 
 Radha Krishna 
 Koteswara Rao 
 Anji 
 Sridhar 
 Swami 
 Sivan 
 Paanla 
 Salmar Suresh 
 Srinivas Vajpai 
 Kalyan Bhupathi 
 Dham
 Pavala Shyamala 
 Shanthi 
 Aparna 
 Padma Reddy 
 Shilpa 
 Kalpana Chowdary 
 Mattisri 
 Master Srinivas Sai as younger Ramesh
 Master Fayaak
 Master Swethik 
 Master Bulbul 
 Baby Predela Manjula 
 Baby Yaani
 Anushka Shetty as an item number in the song "Kedigadu"
 Mahek Chahal as an item number in the song "Muddante"

Soundtrack

The music was composed by Sandeep Chowtha. The music released by ADITYA Music Company.

Production
The film went through a series of name changes in production from Rummy to Mayagadu to Mosagadu, before the producers agreed on Kedi. A Tamil dubbed version of the movie was also released, entitled Singa Vettai.
The film was also dubbed in Hindi as Gambler No 1. The video clip of the song "Neeve Na Neeve Na" was shot in Milos Island in Greece.

References

External links
 

2010 films
2010s Telugu-language films
Indian action comedy films
Films shot in Goa
Films set in Goa
Films scored by Sandeep Chowta
Films shot in Greece
2010 action comedy films